Juaso is a town and is the capital of Asante Akim South, a district in the Ashanti Region of Ghana.

Transport 
The town is served by a station on the central line of Ghana Railway Corporation.

See also 
 Railway stations in Ghana

References

Populated places in the Ashanti Region